Events from the year 1804 in Canada.

Incumbents
Monarch: George III

Federal government
Parliament of Lower Canada: 3rd (until June 13)
Parliament of Upper Canada: 3rd (until March 9)

Governors
Governor of the Canadas: Robert Milnes
Governor of New Brunswick: Thomas Carleton
Governor of Nova Scotia: John Wentworth
Commodore-Governor of Newfoundland: Erasmus Gower
Governor of Prince Edward Island: Edmund Fanning then Joseph Frederick Wallet DesBarres

Events
October 8 –  sinks during snowstorm
David Thompson works in Peace River country.
Lewis and Clark start up the Missouri River.
Merger of the North West Company and XY Fur Companies. The XY Company is absorbed by the North West Company.
1,400 American ships are fishing off Labrador and in the Gulf of St. Lawrence.
The earliest Fraktur paintings appear in Lincoln County, Ontario.
Russians return to Sitka and attack Kiksadi fort on Indian River. Russians lose the battle, but Natives are forced to flee. Baranov re-establishes trading post.
Locks are placed at Coteau, the Cascades and at Long Sault.

Full date unknown 
McTavish Column completed

Births
February 29 – Antoine Plamondon, artist (d.1895)
May 12 – Robert Baldwin, politician (d.1858)
December 13 – Joseph Howe, Premier of Nova Scotia (d.1873)

Deaths
 July 6 – Simon McTavish, fur trader and dealer in furs, militia officer, office holder, landowner, seigneur, and businessman (b.1750)

References 

 
Canada
04
1804 in North America